The 2019–20 Houston Baptist Huskies men's basketball team represented Houston Baptist University in the 2019–20 NCAA Division I men's basketball season. The Huskies, led by 29th-year head coach Ron Cottrell, played their home games at Sharp Gymnasium in Houston, Texas as members of the Southland Conference. They finished the season 4–25, 4–16 in Southland play to finish in last place. They failed to qualify for the Southland Conference tournament.

Previous season
The Huskies finished the 2018–19 season 12–18 overall, 8–10 in Southland play, to finish in a tie for seventh place. In the Southland tournament, they were defeated by Lamar in the first round.

Roster

Schedule and results

|-
!colspan=12 style=| Regular season

|-

Source

See also 
2019–20 Houston Baptist Huskies women's basketball team

References

Houston Christian Huskies men's basketball seasons
Houston Baptist Huskies
Houston Baptist Huskies men's basketball
Houston Baptist Huskies men's basketball